Gruffydd ap Rhydderch (d. AD 1055) was a king of Gwent and part of the kingdom of Morgannwg in south Wales and later king of Deheubarth.

Gruffydd was the son of Rhydderch ab Iestyn who had been able to take over the kingdom of Deheubarth from 1023 to 1033. He received the lordship of Caerleon in 1031 and strengthened its fortifications. Already king of part of Morgannwg, Gruffydd became involved with Deheubarth when that kingdom was taken over from Hywel ab Edwin by Gruffydd ap Llywelyn, already king of Gwynedd, in 1044. Gruffydd ap Rhydderch was however able to expel him in 1045 and became king of Deheubarth himself. He was said to be a powerful king who stoutly resisted raids by the Danes and attacks by Gruffydd ap Llywelyn. In 1055 however Gruffydd ap Llywelyn killed him in battle and recaptured Deheubarth.

In 1049 he is reported raiding up the River Severn in alliance with an Irish Viking Fleet.

His son Caradog ap Gruffydd (who received Caerleon in 1057) also attempted to emulate his father and grandfather by gaining control of Deheubarth but was killed at the Battle of Mynydd Carn.

References 

John Edward Lloyd (1911) A history of Wales from the earliest times to the Edwardian conquest (Longmans, Green & Co.)

External links 
National Library of Wales Dictionary of Welsh Biography

People from Caerleon
1055 deaths
Monarchs of Gwent
Monarchs of Morgannwg
Medieval Welsh killed in battle
11th-century Welsh monarchs
Year of birth unknown
Monarchs killed in action
Monarchs of Glywysing